Jason Isaac Cutler (born August 3, 1973) is an American retired professional bodybuilder. Cutler is a four-time Mr. Olympia winner, having won in 2006, 2007, 2009, and 2010; and a six-time runner-up. He is considered to be one of the top and greatest pro bodybuilders in history, and was known for his quadriceps, insane physique, and the quad-stomp pose.

Early life
Jason Isaac Cutler was born in Worcester, Massachusetts on August 3, 1973. He grew up in nearby Sterling and attended Wachusett Regional High School in Holden. He began working in his brother's concrete construction business, Cutler Bros. Concrete, when he was 11 years old. He started training to be a bodybuilder at the age of 18. He graduated from Quinsigamond Community College in 1993 with a degree in criminal justice, intending to work as a corrections officer for a maximum security prison.

Career
Cutler was inspired to enter bodybuilding by personal trainer Marcos Rodriguez. Desiring to be one of the largest competitors ever, he had his first overall win at the 1993 Iron Bodies Invitational. His first contest was the 1992 Gold's Gym Worcester Bodybuilding Championships, at which he took second place. As he established a name for himself in the bodybuilding scene, he often appeared in bodybuilding-related videos including Battle for the Olympia 2001, a pre-contest documentary video directed by Mitsuru Okabe that highlighted many competitors as they prepared for the 2001 Mr. Olympia Competition.  He went on to win consecutive Arnold Classic titles in 2002, 2003, and 2004, and placed second to Ronnie Coleman in the Mr. Olympia competition four times before claiming the title for the first time in 2006.

At the 2001 Mr. Olympia, Cutler tested positive for banned diuretics, but sued and had his second-place finish reinstated. He won the Olympia for a second consecutive year in 2007. He became the third Mr. Olympia in history (after Arnold Schwarzenegger and Franco Columbu) to win the title in non-consecutive years after defeating the reigning champion Dexter Jackson in 2009. In 2010, he won his fourth Mr. Olympia title, defeating Phil Heath. In 2011, he was runner-up to Heath at the Mr. Olympia. In 2012, he was unable to compete at the Mr. Olympia due to a biceps injury. He placed sixth in the 2013 Olympia.

Throughout his career, Cutler has been  on the cover of fitness magazines such as Muscle and Fitness, Flex, and Muscular Development. He has not competed since 2013 and has instead focused on Cutler Nutrition, his bodybuilding supplement business, as well as other business ventures through social media.

Stats
Height: 
Off-season weight: 
Competition weight: 
Upper arms: 
Chest: 
Thighs: 
Waist: 
Calves:

Bodybuilding titles

 1993 NPC Iron Bodies Invitational – Teenage & Men's Heavyweight
 1993 NPC Teen Nationals – Heavyweight
 1995 NPC U.S. Tournament of Champions – Men's Heavyweight and Overall
 2000 IFBB Night of Champions
 2002 Arnold Classic
 2003 Arnold Classic
 2003 Ironman Pro Invitational
 2003 San Francisco Pro Invitational
 2003 Dutch Grand Prix.
 2003 British Grand Prix
 2004 Arnold Classic
 2006 Austrian Grand Prix
 2006 Romanian Grand Prix
 2006 Dutch Grand Prix
 2006 Mr. Olympia
 2007 Mr. Olympia
 2009 Mr. Olympia
 2010 Mr. Olympia

Competitive placings 

 1992 Gold Gym Worcester Bodybuilding Championships – 2nd
 1996 NPC Nationals, 1st place Heavyweight (earned IFBB pro card)
 1998 IFBB Night of Champions – 11th
 1999 Arnold Schwarzenegger Classic – 4th
 1999 IFBB Ironman Pro Invitational – 3rd
 1999 Mr. Olympia – 14th
 2000 English Grand Prix – 2nd
 2000 Joe Weider's World Pro Cup – 2nd
 2000 Mr. Olympia – 8th
 2000 Mr. Olympia Rome – 2nd
 2001 Mr. Olympia – 2nd
 2003 Mr. Olympia – 2nd
 2003 Russian Grand Prix – 2nd
 2003 GNC Show of Strength – 2nd
 2004 Mr. Olympia – 2nd
 2005 Mr. Olympia – 2nd
 2006 Mr. Olympia – 1st
 2007 Mr. Olympia – 1st
 2008 Mr. Olympia – 2nd
 2009 Mr. Olympia – 1st
 2010 Mr. Olympia – 1st
 2011 Mr. Olympia – 2nd
 2011 Sheru Classic – 2nd
 2013 Mr. Olympia – 6th

Books
 Jay Cutler's No Nonsense Guide To Successful Bodybuilding

See also
 List of male professional bodybuilders

References

External links

Official website

| colspan="3" style="text-align:center;"| Mr. Olympia
|-
| style="width:50%; text-align:center;"| Preceded by:Dexter Jackson
| style="width:30%; text-align:center;"| Succeeded by:Phil Heath

1973 births
American bodybuilders
Living people
People from Sterling, Massachusetts
Professional bodybuilders